SCENECS International Debut Film Festival, is held annually in Hilversum, the Netherlands and is produced by the SCENECS foundation.

Festival
The festival uniquely promotes new and emerging filmmakers from around the world. It provides a platform to introduce themselves and their craft to their new audience and also to the film industry. Here, the completed films receive their first preview. The entries also participate in an international competition in the categories fiction, short fiction, documentary and student film. The winning entries in each category receive an award, shich is presented at the SCENECS Grand Gala Award Event, this ceremony wraps up the end of the festival on the last night. SCENECS consist of a film festival, award ceremony, international exchange program and different activities with regards to film education and the development of talent.

History 
The festival was founded in 2006 by the film maker Arya Tariverdi and organised in Amersfoort, the Netherlands. It is the first film festival in the Netherlands to focus entirely on debutant filmmakers. In 2016 the festivalmoved its program and head office to the media city of Hilversum.

Festival locations
The venues of the festival are currently: VUE Hilversum, Studio 21, Film Theater Hilversum and various libraries.

Awards

Official award
This award, called "the Dutch Golden Stone Award" is in the image of a winged female form, with a golden stone in her hands. The award was designed in 2005 by Arya Tariverdi and made by the Dutch artist Ellis de Kreij.

Award categories
The Dutch Golden Stone Award is awarded during the annual Grand Gala Award Event to the directors of the categories of Best Fiction, Best Short Fiction, Best Documentary and Best Student Film. In addition awards are also presented in the categories of Best Acting Talent, Audience Award and Litetime Achievement Award.

Miss SCENECS Film Festival
In 2006 the festival introduced "Miss SCENECS Film Festival". Every year a young talented woman from the entertainment and film industry is selected by the organization and awarded with this title. Her role in this title is as festival ambassador and promote its activities. Miss SCENECS Film Festival portraits the Dutch Golden Stone Award and during the award event she awards the winners. In 2017 Miss Asia Pacific International (2016), Tessa le Conge was awarded with this title.

Award Winners

SCENECS Award for Best Fiction

SCENECS Award for Best Short Fiction

SCENECS Award for Best Documentary

SCENECS Lifetime Achievement Award

VUE Audience Award

SCENECS Talent Award

SCENECS Award for Best Acting Talent

References

External links 
 "Scenecs". Festagent.com. Retrieved 2017-07-18
 Official website

Film festivals in the Netherlands
Events in Hilversum